Lewis is an unincorporated community in Henry County, in the U.S. state of Missouri.

History
Lewis was originally called "Lewis Station", and under the latter name was platted in 1876, and named after Howell Lewis, the original owner of the town site. A post office called Lewis Station was established in 1871, and remained in operation until 1944.

References

Unincorporated communities in Henry County, Missouri
Unincorporated communities in Missouri